The Church of St Mary, formally the Church of the Assumption of Mary or more commonly known as Santa Marija ta' Bubaqra, is a Roman Catholic church located in the village of Żurrieq, in the area called Bubaqra, in Malta.

History
The present church may have been built on the original site of two old chapels, one dedicated to Saint Roch and the other to Saint Sebastian. The chapel of St Mary was built after the plague of 1676. The chapel experienced major restructuring in 1961 when it was enlarged to accommodate the increasing population of the area. This was done on the initiative of Reverend Salv Farrugia.

References

17th-century Roman Catholic church buildings in Malta
Roman Catholic chapels in Żurrieq
National Inventory of the Cultural Property of the Maltese Islands